Anders Nielsen (born November 23, 1972) is a Danish football coach and former player. He works as youth coach at Kalundborg GB. He is the former manager of Denmark Series team Svebølle B&I.

Club career
Nielsen was born in Kalundborg, Denmark. He started his career playing 130 Danish Superliga games for Lyngby Boldklub from 1991 to 1996, winning the 1991–92 Danish Superliga. He moved abroad in 1996 to play for PSV Eindhoven, RKC Waalwijk, and Sparta Rotterdam in the Netherlands, as well as Italian club AS Varese.

He moved back to Denmark in 2003, to play for lower-league clubs Kalundborg GB and Holbæk B&I. In 2006, he was named player-manager of Svebølle B&I. In 2010, he left the club after failing to secure the promotion to the Danish 2nd Divisions. He then became youth coach at Kalundborg GB.

International career
He played four games for the Denmark national under-19 football team from 1991 to 1992.

References

External links
 Danish national team profile
 Danish Superliga statistics

1972 births
Living people
Association football wingers
Association football midfielders
Danish men's footballers
Denmark youth international footballers
Danish expatriate men's footballers
Danish Superliga players
Eredivisie players
Danish football managers
Lyngby Boldklub players
People from Kalundborg
PSV Eindhoven players
RKC Waalwijk players
Sparta Rotterdam players
S.S.D. Varese Calcio players
Expatriate footballers in the Netherlands
Expatriate footballers in Italy
Holbæk B&I players
Danish expatriate sportspeople in the Netherlands
Danish expatriate sportspeople in Italy
Sportspeople from Region Zealand